Rumyana Neykova (born 6 April 1973 in Sofia) is a Bulgarian rower. Neykova competed at the 1992 Summer Olympics, the 1996 Summer Olympics, the 2000 Summer Olympics, where she won silver in Single Sculls, the 2004 Summer Olympics, where she won bronze and the 2008 Summer Olympics, where she won gold in the same discipline. Her current coach is her husband Svilen Neykov. In 2002, she set the world best time of 7:07:41 on 21 September in Seville ESP and she was named Bulgarian Sportswoman of the Year, as well as FISA Female Rower of the Year.

Neykova has been involved in rowing since 1985, when she began training at CSKA Sofia coached Verka Aleksieva. In 1989, she was vice-world junior champion, winning that title in 1990. After several unsuccessful attempts with women's doubles and quadruples, she switched to Single Sculls and won her first medal at the 1999 world championships in Canada. She has two world titles in that discipline, at Sevilla 2002 and Milan 2003, as well as being world second in 2007 in Gifu.

At the 2000 Summer Olympics in Sydney, she narrowly lost the Olympic title to Ekaterina Karsten of Belarus by photo finish, in what was seen in Bulgaria as a very controversial judges' decision. After the Olympics, she took a one-year break, giving birth to her son Emil who has followed his parents footsteps and has become a successful rower. At the Athens Olympics in 2004, she finished third in Single Sculls, behind Katrin Rutschow-Stomporowski of Germany and Karsten. At the 2005 world championships, she also competed in Double Sculls, coming second together with Miglena Markova.

Neykova finally won her first Olympic title at the 2008 Summer Olympics in Beijing, beating Michelle Guerette of the United States as well as her year-long rival Karsten to secure the gold medal on 16 August. With her title in Beijing, Neykova has a full collection of Olympic medals: a silver, a bronze and a gold one.

References
 
 
 

Living people
1973 births
Rowers from Sofia
Bulgarian female rowers
Olympic rowers of Bulgaria
Rowers at the 1992 Summer Olympics
Rowers at the 1996 Summer Olympics
Rowers at the 2000 Summer Olympics
Rowers at the 2004 Summer Olympics
Rowers at the 2008 Summer Olympics
Olympic gold medalists for Bulgaria
Olympic bronze medalists for Bulgaria
Olympic silver medalists for Bulgaria
Olympic medalists in rowing
Medalists at the 2008 Summer Olympics
Medalists at the 2004 Summer Olympics
Medalists at the 2000 Summer Olympics
World Rowing Championships medalists for Bulgaria
European Rowing Championships medalists